Mobile warfare is a military strategy of the People’s Republic of China employing conventional forces on fluid fronts with units maneuvering to exploit opportunities for tactical surprise, or where a local superiority of forces can be realized. One of early CCP leader Mao Zedong's three forms of warfare, mobile warfare was the primary form of warfare used by Chinese communist forces from the early 1930s to the conclusion of the Chinese Civil War. Mao's other two defined forms of warfare, guerrilla warfare and positional warfare, were less frequently employed.

The most notable example of Chinese mobile warfare was the Long March, a massive military retreat in which Mao marched in circles in Guizhou until he had confused the vastly larger armies pursuing him, and was then able to slip through Yunnan and Sichuan, although the retreat was completed by only one-tenth of the force that left for the Long March at Jiangxi. A sensible comparison would be Robert E. Lee's surrender at Appomattox Court House, though he was never outnumbered to the degree Mao regularly was.

The Chinese People's Volunteer Army's first five campaigns in the Korean War were characterized by a strategy of mobile warfare, in which the PVA encircled the enemy through maneuvers and sought to annihilate the enemy. Then it entered a stage of positional warfare, when both the PVA and UN forces fought to a stalemate along the 38th parallel north.

See also 
Tunnel war

References

Sources
Seeking Truth From Facts: RAND 1991, page 136.  The book is mostly about post-Mao developments within the Chinese military.
various English-language sources using the phrase

Military strategy
Military history of the People's Republic of China
Military history of China
Mao Zedong